Odaimarichan 
Tirunelveli district of Tamil Nadu State in South India.

Sources 

Villages in Tirunelveli district